The Japanese National Time Trial Championships are conducted every year under the auspices of the Japan Cycling Federation.
The record is held by Kazuya Okazaki with 4 wins.

Multiple winners (Men)

Men

Elite

U23

Women

Elite

See also
Japanese National Road Race Championships

External links
 Japan Cycling Federation (in Japanese)

National road cycling championships
Cycle races in Japan
Recurring sporting events established in 1998
1998 establishments in Japan